The Tabernacle-Fireman's Field is a historic meeting site and picnic grounds located at Purcellville, Loudoun County, Virginia, US. The property includes the Bush Meeting Taberbacle. It is an eight-sided, frame building measuring approximately 80 feet by 160 feet.  It was originally built to house the "Bush Meetings" that were conducted by the Prohibition and Evangelical Association of Loudoun County, Virginia.  The 8,500 square foot building could accommodate 3,000 seats.  In 1939, it was converted into a skating roller rink, a function it has continued to serve. It closed temporarily in 2009 but reopened a year later.  Also on the property are two contributing barbeque pits and a picnic pavilion. Fireman's Field, which serves as the home to the Purcellville Cannons of the Valley Baseball League, is on the property as well.

It was listed on the National Register of Historic Places in 2010.  It is located in the Purcellville Historic District.

References

Event venues on the National Register of Historic Places in Virginia
Buildings and structures completed in 1798
Buildings and structures in Loudoun County, Virginia
National Register of Historic Places in Loudoun County, Virginia
Individually listed contributing properties to historic districts on the National Register in Virginia
Purcellville, Virginia